Brad Michael Keller (born July 27, 1995) is an American professional baseball pitcher for the Kansas City Royals of Major League Baseball (MLB).

Amateur career
Keller attended Flowery Branch High School in Flowery Branch, Georgia, playing for their baseball team, the Falcons. He was drafted by the Arizona Diamondbacks in the eighth round of the 2013 MLB draft. He had committed to play college baseball at Presbyterian College, but chose to sign with the Diamondbacks rather than attend college.

Professional career

Arizona Diamondbacks
Keller made his professional debut that year with the Arizona League Diamondbacks and was later promoted to the Missoula Osprey. In 15 games (13 starts), he posted a 7–3 record and 2.44 ERA. In 2014, he pitched for the Arizona League Diamondbacks, Missoula and Hillsboro Hops, going 6–4 with a 4.31 ERA over 15 games (12 starts). Keller pitched for the Kane County Cougars in 2015, going 8–9 with a 2.60 ERA over 26 games (25 starts), the Visalia Rawhide in 2016 where he went 9–7 with a 4.47 ERA in 24 starts, and 2017 with the Jackson Generals, where he posted a 10–9 record and 4.68 ERA in 26 starts.

Kansas City Royals
On December 14, 2017, Keller was selected by the Cincinnati Reds in the Rule 5 draft and immediately traded to the Kansas City Royals for cash considerations.

Keller made the 25-man roster for the Royals in 2018 and had his MLB debut on Opening Day, March 29, pitching an inning of scoreless relief against the Chicago White Sox; he struck out the first batter he faced, Adam Engel. He split time between the bullpen and the rotation, leading the team in ERA (3.08) and tied for first on the team in wins (9). He struck out 96 batters in  innings. On April 19, 2019, Keller received a five-game suspension by Major League Baseball, which concluded he intentionally threw a pitch that hit Tim Anderson of the Chicago White Sox.

On July 7, 2020, it was announced that Keller had tested positive for COVID-19. Ten days later, he was cleared to return to the Royals’ Summer Camp after producing two negative tests at least 24 hours apart. On September 13, 2020, Keller pitched the first complete game shutout of his career against the Pittsburgh Pirates, allowing five hits (only one for extra bases) and one walk, striking out two batters. With the 2020 Kansas City Royals, Keller appeared in nine games, compiling a 5–3 record with 2.47 ERA and 35 strikeouts in  innings pitched. In 2021, he started 26 games and posted an 8–12 record, a 5.39 ERA and 120 strikeouts in  innings.

References

External links

1995 births
Living people
Arizona League Diamondbacks players
Baseball players from Georgia (U.S. state)
Hillsboro Hops players
Kane County Cougars players
Jackson Generals (Southern League) players
Kansas City Royals players
Major League Baseball pitchers
Missoula Osprey players
People from Hall County, Georgia
Sportspeople from the Atlanta metropolitan area
Visalia Rawhide players